The Longfellow School in Raton, New Mexico, at 700 E. 4th St., is an elementary school which was built in 1939 as a Works Progress Administration project.  It was listed on the National Register of Historic Places in 1996.

It was designed by architect William C. Kruger in a modest Moderne style. It is a one-story brick building.  It was extended by additions of four classrooms to the south in the 1960s and a library to the rear, but these do not detract from its historic character.

References

Schools in New Mexico
National Register of Historic Places in Colfax County, New Mexico
Moderne architecture in the United States
Buildings and structures completed in 1939